Rosabell Laurenti Sellers (born March 27, 1996) is an American-Italian actress. She is known for her role as the titular character in the children's series, Mia and Me, and also as Tyene Sand in Game of Thrones.

Early life 
Sellers was born in Santa Monica, California to American actress Mary Sellers and Italian filmmaker Fabrizio Laurenti. She grew up in New York City before moving to Rome. She has one brother and one sister.

Career 
Sellers made her debut in the theater in 2004 at the age of eight, when she and her brother were assigned to the part of the children of Medea in the production of the theater company La Mama. After staging in New York and a tour of the same show in Poland and Austria, she moved briefly to Rome that same year with her family.

After she arrived in Italy, she began to take part in TV and film productions. In 2006 she participated in the mini-series directed by Maurizio Ponzi's E poi c'è Filippo, the years following in L'amore e la guerra, the television series Medicina generale and the television movie Fuga per la libertà – L'aviatore, the miniseries Coco Chanel and the film Mi Ricordo Anna Frank in the lead role. In 2009, in Fausto Brizzi's Many Kisses Later, while the following year in the miniseries Paura di amare.

In 2010, Sellers played the daughter of Kathryn Bolkovac (Rachel Weisz) in Larysa Kondracki's The Whistleblower. In 2012, she took part in the TV series Una grande famiglia and arrived on Rai 2 in the series Mia and Me that features alternating sequences in live action and scenes created in computer graphics. In June 2012 she took a part in Edoardo Leo's Buongiorno papà, alongside Raoul Bova. Meanwhile, at the 69th Venice International Film Festival, she was presented in Ivano De Matteo's Balancing Act and in A Liberal Passion, alongside Alessandro Preziosi and Valentina Lodovini, loosely based on the 2008 novel by Chiara Gamberale.

In 2015, she joined the cast of the HBO series Game of Thrones in Season 5 as Tyene Sand.

In 2020, she joined the cast of the SyFy series Spides as Nora Berger.

Personal life 
 Sellers is studying at the Guildhall School of Music and Drama in London. Sellers has participated in many equestrian competitions and has also studied tap dance. Sellers is fluent in English and Italian.

Philanthropy 
Sellers founded the Young Actors for Humanitarian Involvement, to get teen Italian talents involved in charities such as ActionAid and Smile Again. She also serves meals at Rome's Comunità di Sant'Egidio soup kitchen. Sellers also has volunteered with another organization called Veto the Squito which helps raise money for insecticide treated bed nets in Africa. She has also collaborated with the League Against Racism and Anti-Semitism.

Filmography

Film

Television

References

External links 
 

1996 births
21st-century American actresses
Living people
Actresses from New York City
Actresses from Santa Monica, California
American people of Italian descent
American television actresses